

Heinrich Meyer-Buerdorf (13 December 1888 – 1 May 1971) was a general in the Wehrmacht of Nazi Germany during World War II who commanded the 131st Infantry Division. He was a recipient of the Knight's Cross of the Iron Cross.

Awards

 Knight's Cross of the Iron Cross on 15 November 1941 as Generalleutnant and commander of 131. Infanterie-Division

References

Citations

Bibliography

 

1888 births
1971 deaths
Military personnel from Kassel
Generals of Artillery (Wehrmacht)
German Army personnel of World War I
Recipients of the clasp to the Iron Cross, 1st class
Recipients of the Gold German Cross
Recipients of the Knight's Cross of the Iron Cross
People from Hesse-Nassau
German Army generals of World War II